The North-East Democratic Alliance or NEDA is a political coalition that was formed on May 24, 2016, by Bharatiya Janata Party. The motive of the new political front was to protect the interest of the people of the region as well as uniting non-Congress parties in Northeast India. Himanta Biswa Sarma was appointed as the convenor of the front.

History

The alliance was established after Bharatiya Janata Party led National Democratic Alliance which includes parties like Asom Gana Parishad and Bodoland People's Front formed its first government in Assam. The founding political parties of North-East Democratic Alliance led by Bharatiya Janata Party on May 26, 2019, included Naga People's Front, Sikkim Democratic Front, People's Party of Arunachal, Asom Gana Parishad and Bodoland People's Front. The Chief Ministers of the northeastern states of Sikkim, Pawan Kumar Chamling; Assam, Sarbananda Sonowal; Arunachal Pradesh, Kalikho Pul and Nagaland, T. R. Zeliang  were the founding members of the alliance. BJP President Amit Shah chaired the meeting which was also attended by BJP General Secretary Ram Madhav and BJP North East Zonal Organizing Secretary Ajay Jamwal.
The alliance suffered a big setback in Arunachal Pradesh when their 30 MLAs defected back to Indian National Congress.

On 16 September 2016, 43 MLAs from the ruling party, under the CM Pema Khandu, left Indian National Congress to join  People's Party of Arunachal in alliance with Bharatiya Janata Party. Though Pema Khandu is still the Chief Minister, it is soon expected that either a coalition government will be formed with BJP as the speaker of assembly has also changed sides with the CM, or that the Indian Government will dissolve the state assembly for fresh general elections.

In October 2016, People's Party of Arunachal formally joined hands with Bharatiya Janata Party making Arunachal Pradesh 15th state to have BJP led NDA in Power, and with this new coalition, Tamiyo Taga sworn in as Cabinet minister of Arunachal Pradesh.

On December 21, 2016, Khandu  was suspended from the party by the party president and Takam Pario was named as the next likely Chief Minister of Arunachal Pradesh replacing Khandu after People's Party of Arunachal suspended Khandu along with 6 other MLAs.

In December 2016, Khandu proved the majority on the floor with 33 of the People's Party of Arunachal’s 43 legislators joining the Bharatiya Janata Party as the BJP party increased its strength to 45 and it has the support of two independents.  He became second Chief Minister of Arunachal Pradesh of Bharatiya Janata Party in Arunachal Pradesh after 44 days lead Gegong Apang government in 2003.

In March 2017,Nongthombam Biren Singh  is the leader of Bharatiya Janata Party was sworn in the Chief Ministers of Manipur on March 15, 2017. Here is the list of the ministers of his ministry. The Bharatiya Janata Party allied with National People's Party, Naga People's Front, Lok Janshakti Party and others it was the first time that BJP formed government in Manipur through INC emerged as the single largest party.

In 2018, the BJP and the ruling Nagaland People's Front dissolved their electoral alliance prior to the election.  The BJP instead chose to form an alliance with the newly formed Nationalist Democratic Progressive Party, led by former CM Neiphiu Rio.Lok Sabha MP and former Chief Minister Neiphiu Rio of the Nationalist Democratic Progressive Party was declared elected uncontested in the Northern Angami II constituency after no other candidate was nominated against him.

In March 2018, The National People's Party came second behind Indian National Congress by winning 19 seats in the 2018 Meghalaya legislative assembly election. Conrad Sangma staked claim to form government with a letter of support from the 34 MLA, that included 19 from NPP, 6 from United Democratic Party, 4 from People's Democratic Front, two each from Hill State People's Democratic Party and Bharatiya Janata Party, and an independent.

In March 2018, Nationalist Democratic Progressive Party came second behind Naga People's Front by winning 18 seats in the 2018 Nagaland legislative assembly election. Neiphiu Rio staked claim to form government with a letter of support from the 32 MLA, that included 17 from NDPP, 12 from Bharatiya Janata Party, 1 from Janata Dal (United) and an independent.

In March 2018, Bharatiya Janata Party won the 2018 Tripura legislative assembly election 35 seats. Its ally Indigenous Peoples Front of Tripura won 8 of 9 seats which they contested. The alliance defeated Communist Party of India (Marxist) who was ruling since 1993.

In 2018 state assembly elections, Mizo National Front has emerged as largest political party and won 26 seats and Pu Zoramthanga became the new Chief Minister of Mizoram. This was the first time that Congress does not have any government in any of the states in Northeast India.

In  May 2019, Bharatiya Janata Party won the 2018 Arunachal Pradesh legislative assembly election 41 seats whereas its ally's National People's Party won 5 and Janata Dal (United) got 7 seats.  National People's Party was accorded the status of National Party from Election Commission of India as it got 5 seats in the assembly with a vote share of 14.56% getting also the status of a Recognized State Party in Arunachal Pradesh. Janata Dal (United) party got the status of a Recognized State Party by the Election Commission of India as it secured 7 seats in the assembly winning a vote share of 9.88% in the state.

In Sikkim, The Sikkim Krantikari Morcha came close to allying with Bhartiya Janata Party before the 2019 Indian Election but decided to fight alone. They contested on all 32 constituencies of the Sikkim Legislative Assembly and won 17 constituencies, thus ending Pawan Kumar Chamling's 25-year rule in Sikkim. Indra Hang Subba won the Sikkim Lok Sabha constituency by defeating his nearest rival of Sikkim Democratic Front Dek Bahadur Katwal 12,443 margin.

After the assembly election, 1 MLA from Sikkim Krantikari Morcha and 2 MLAs from Sikkim Democratic Front each vacated their second seat after being elected from two constituencies. Before the by-elections to these three vacant seats were held, 10 MLAs of Sikkim Democratic Front defected to Bhartiya Janata Party and 2 MLAs of Sikkim Democratic Front  defected to Sikkim Krantikari Morcha, leaving Sikkim Democratic Front with only 1 MLA. SKM had 18 MLAs and BJP had 10 MLAs. In the by-elections held on 21 October 2019, BJP won two seats and SKM one seat. The final seat numbers are: SKM 19 seats, BJP 12 seats and SDF 1 seat.

On 17 June 2020 9 MLAs supporting N. Biren Singh led the government in Manipur revolted against him and withdrew support from his government blaming him for lack of action during COVID-19 pandemic. During the vote of confidence, he was one of the eight MLAs who had skipped the assembly proceedings defying the party whip for the trust vote. All member resigned from Indian National Congress and later joined Bharatiya Janata Party in presence of Ram Madhav, Baijayant Panda and Chief Minister of Manipur N. Biren Singh.

In November 2020, Bharatiya Janata Party announced that it has agreed to support efforts by the UPPL to form an executive body in Bodoland Territorial Council. The leader of the UPPL, Pramod Boro became the new Chief Executive Member of the Bodoland Territorial Council on 15 December 2020.

Soon after the election results were declared and the BJP led NDA emerged victorious it faced the dilemma of who should we made the Chief Minister. While most of the top leaders in the BJP state unit favored incumbent Chief Minister Sarbananda Sonowal, speculations suggest that Himanta Biswa Sarma had more number of elected  MLAs of the BJP on his side. Due to prolonged discontent between the two leaders a BJP legislature party meeting couldn't have been called. On 10 May 2021, Sarma was sworn in as the Chief Minister of Assam, succeeding his colleague Sarbananda Sonowal.

Members

Strength in state legislative assemblies

Legislative leaders

Chief Ministers

Deputy chief ministers

NEDA coalition in Autonomous district councils  
Autonomous district councils operating under the Sixth Schedule of the Constitution of India are shown in bold.

See also

 National Democratic Alliance
 Coalition government
 Manik Saha ministry
 Conrad Sangma ministry
 Second N. Biren Singh ministry
 Neiphiu Rio Ministry
 Sarbanand Sonowal ministry
 Third Zoramthanga ministry
 Prem Singh Tamang ministry
 Himanta Biswa Ministry

References

Notes

Citations

Sources

External links 

National Democratic Alliance
Political parties established in 2016
Coalition governments of India
Political party alliances in India
Conservative parties in India
2016 establishments in India